The 2016–17 Morehead State Eagles men's basketball team represented Morehead State University during the 2016–17 NCAA Division I men's basketball season. The Eagles, led by interim head coach Preston Spradlin, played their home games at Ellis Johnson Arena in Morehead, Kentucky as members of the East Division of the Ohio Valley Conference. The Eagles finished the season 14–16, 10–6 in OVC play to finish in second place in the East Division. In the OVC tournament they lost to Murray State in the quarterfinals.

On November 22, 2016, Morehead State suspended head coach Sean Woods with pay while the school investigated complaints made against Woods. Assistant coach Preston Spradlin was named interim head coach. On December 15, two days after Woods was charged with misdemeanor battery in Indiana for allegedly assaulting two of his players during a game versus Evansville, it was announced that Woods had resigned. It was announced that Spradlin would continue as interim coach while the school conducted a nationwide search for a replacement. On March 16, 2017, Spradlin was named full-time head coach.

Previous season 
The Eagles finished the 2015–16 season 23–14, 11–5 in OVC play to finish in a three-way tie for second place in the East Division. They defeated Murray State in the quarterfinals of the OVC tournament to advance to the semifinals where they lost to UT Martin. They were invited to the College Basketball Invitational where they defeated Siena, Duquesne, and Ohio to advance to the best-of-three finals series against Nevada. In the finals, they lost the CIT championship two games to one.

Preseason 
In a vote of Ohio Valley Conference head men’s basketball coaches and sports information directors, Morehead State was picked to finish third in the East Division of the OVC. Xavier Moon was selected to the All-OVC Preseason Team.

Roster

Schedule and results

|-
!colspan=9 style=| Exhibition

|-
!colspan=9 style=| Non-conference regular season

|-
!colspan=9 style=| Ohio Valley Conference regular season

|-
!colspan=9 style=|Ohio Valley tournament

References

Morehead State Eagles men's basketball seasons
Morehead State
Morehead State
Morehead State